Alan Merril Gottlieb is an American author, conservative political activist, gun rights advocate, and businessperson. Gottlieb has published 23 books.

Biography
He was born in Los Angeles and graduated from the University of Tennessee in the summer of 1971, after a five-year course, with a degree in nuclear engineering.
He was indicted by a federal grand jury on charges of filing false income tax returns in 1977 and 1978 by failing to include gross receipts of $138,000 and $260,000 those two years from Merril Associates, his political fund-raising firm

Gottlieb is a defender of gun rights, and most of his 19 books are about the subject. Gottlieb is a businessman who owns several businesses whose target market is libertarian to conservative groups.

Gottlieb owns Merril Press, an "independent publisher of unusual nonfiction books by authors who know what they're writing about." He is also president of four radio stations, including KITZ in Port Orchard, Washington, KGTK in Olympia, Washington, KBNP in Portland, Oregon, and KSBN in Spokane, Washington.

Gottlieb is also the Chairman of the Citizens Committee for the Right to Keep and Bear Arms, Founder of the Second Amendment Foundation, a Board Member of the American Conservative Union, and President of the Center for the Defense of Free Enterprise.

In 1984, Gottlieb plead guilty to filing a tax return that was not true to every material mater and was sentenced to a year and a day in prison by U.S. District Court Judge John Coughenour.

Gottlieb's right to own firearms was restored in 1985.

In 2013, Gottlieb's lobbying organization (the Citizens Committee for the Right to Keep and Bear Arms) would have backed with amendments to expand gun rights a "compromise gun registration amendment proposed by Sens. Joe Manchin and Pat Toomey."

The ill-fated expanded background checks bill was overwhelmingly supported by Senate Democrats and President Barack Obama at the time. The needed gun rights amendments to gain support were blocked and the bill failed.

Works

Gottlieb has published or self-published 23 books.

Books
 Gun Rights Affirmed: The Emerson Case
 Gun Rights Fact Book
 Politically Correct Guns: Please Don't Rob or Kill Me
 Celebrity Address Book
 THE GUN GRABBERS: Who are they, how they operate, where they get their money
 Things You Can Do to Defend Your Gun Rights
 She Took A Village
 Rights of Gun Owners: A Second Amendment
 The Wise Use Agenda
 Gun owner's political action manual
 Black & Blue: How Obama and the Democrats are Beating Up the Constitution

Books co-authored by Gottlieb
 George W. Bush Speaks to the Nation – George W. Bush and Alan M. Gottlieb (Merril Press, 2010)
 Trashing the Economy: How Runaway Environmentalism Is Wrecking America – Ron Arnold and Alan Gottlieb
 Guns for Women – George Flynn and Alan Gottlieb
 More Things You Can Do to Defend Your Gun Rights – by Alan Gottlieb and David Kopel
 Double Trouble: Daschle and Gephardt – Capital Hill Bullies by Alan M. Gottlieb and Dave Workman
 Politically Correct Environment by Alan M. Gottlieb, Ron Arnold, and Chuck Asay
 America Fights Back: Armed Self-defense in a Violent Age by Alan M. Gottlieb and Dave Workman
 These Dogs Don't Hunt: The Democrats' War on Guns by Alan M. Gottlieb and Dave Workman
 Assault on Weapons: The Campaign to Eliminate Your Guns by Alan M. Gottlieb and Dave Workman (2009)
 Dancing in Blood:Exposing the Gun Ban Lobby's Playbook to Destroy Your Rights by Alan Gottlieb and Dave Workman (2014)
 Right to Carry: I carry a Gun a Cop is too Heavy by Alan Gottlieb and Dave Workman (2016)
 Good Guys with Guns by Alan Gottlieb and Dave Workman (2019)

References

Sources
 Bellevue gun-rights advocate becomes key player in national debate | Local News | The Seattle Times
 The Merchant of Fear
 Seattle News and Events | Cover Story: Barack & Load
 Jewish Legal Minds and American Gun Rights: Gura, Sigale, Gottlieb, and Posner

External links
 
 

Living people
American political writers
American male non-fiction writers
Activists from California
Writers from Los Angeles
Jewish American writers
University of Tennessee alumni
Georgetown University alumni
American gun rights activists
Year of birth missing (living people)
21st-century American Jews